Dorian Victor Klonaridis (Greek: Ντοριάν Βίκτωρ Κλωναρίδης, born 28 July 1992) is a Greek-Belgian professional footballer who plays as a winger or a second striker for Super League club Atromitos.

Career

AEK Athens
Klonaridis emerged from the AEK Athens academy as a young prodigy, signing his first professional contract with the club at the age of 18. During his first stint at the club, he made some notable appearances against Panathinaikos FC where he scored his first professional goal in the Greek Superleague and then proceeded to score 3 more goals in the championship. After his impressive performances in the championship and in European football, he secured a transfer with Lille OSC.

Lille
On 2 July 2012, Klonaridis signed a three-year contract with Lille OSC for a reported fee of €800,000. On 31 January 2013, he joined Belgian Second Division side Mouscron-Péruwelz on loan from Lille.

Panathinaikos
On 3 Auguste 2013, Panathinaikos paid to AEK €1 million for his transfer (just like with Giorgos Koutroubis the same summer) and Victor Klonaridis signing a 4-year contract with the "Greens". On 25 September 2013, he scored on his debut, against Ergotelis in the Greek Cup. On 10 November 2013, he netted twice in a 2–0 win against Aris. On 14 May 2014, he helped his club claim Greece's second Champions League spot scoring in a 1–1 draw against Atromitos in the playoffs, which left Panathinaikos with an unassailable lead at the top of the table with one match left.

At the beginning of 2015–16 season, Klonaridis faced injury problems causing him to train separately from the rest of the squad. On 28 October 2015, he scored his first goal for the season, playing in the Greek Cup against Levadiakos. On 3 December 2015, Panathinaikos won 2–1 against Panachaiki at Pampeloponnisiako Stadium thanks to a brace scored by him in the first half. On 23 May 2016, he scored in a 3–0 defeat of rivals AEK Athens reaching 100 appearances with for Panathinaikos.

On 14 August 2016, Panathinaikos accepted a bid from Belgian club Lokeren for a transfer fee, reported to be in the region of €300,000. However, the move was not completed.

Lens
On 31 August 2016, the last day of the summer window transfer, Klonaridis returned to France, signing a two-year contract with Ligue 2 club Lens, for an undisclosed fee.

Loan to Panathinaikos
On 30 January 2017, Klonaridis returned to Panathinaikos, initially on loan, but with an option for the Greek club to sign him permanently.
On 31 May 2017, his goal and overall positive performance, helped his club to succeed an away 3–2 win against rivals PAOK in the last matchday of the 2016–17 Playoffs depriving them of the possibility to participate in the UEFA Champions League third qualifying round.

Return to AEK Athens
On 29 June 2017, Klonaridis joined Super League side AEK Athens by signing a contract until June 2020. AEK paid €200,000 to acquire Klonaridis from Lens. On 8 August 2018, he scored before the break in a 1–1 away draw for UEFA Champions League Third qualifying round, 1st leg against Celtic. On 22 August 2018, he scored, slamming home the rebound from close range after Anastasios Bakasetas' snapshot had been parried by MOL Vidi's goalkeeper Ádám Kovácsik in a glorious 2–1 away win for UEFA Champions League Playoffs, 1st leg against MOL Vidi.

On 16 September 2018, Klonaridis scored his first brace with the club in a 4–0 home win game against Panionios, as six minutes from full time with a brilliant piece of individual skill, skipping past the challenge of Luis Gustavo Dominques before firing a powerful shot beyond Panthers goalkeeper Filip Manojlović and at the last minute of the match scoring his second of the night, slotting home after good work from striker Marko Livaja. On 2 October 2018, he scored a brace in a 2–3 loss UEFA Champions League home game against Benfica. In both goals, he scored with a right footed shot from very close range after assisted by Niklas Hult and Marios Oikonomou respectively, but after the AEK forward missed a great chance for his hat-trick, Alfa Semedo's long-range strike won it for Benfica on the counterattack. He has become the team's first player in history to score twice in one single group match.

On 22 January 2020, Klonaridis scored his first goal for the season, after a Hélder Lopes assist,  in a 3–1 away win against Volos. The speedy 27-year-old has previously been plagued by injuries this season. The goal was Klonaridis’ first since 2 October 2018, when he scored twice in a 3–2 home defeat to Benfica in the UEFA Champions League group stage. On 1 March 2020, Klonaridis scored a stunning goal in stoppage time to salvage a thrilling 1–1 away draw for AEK against Panionios. On 30 June 2020, Klonaridis solved his contract with the club. At times, the talented 27-year-old forward showed glimpses of his potential, but he was often hindered by injury problems and a lack of consistency.

APOEL
On 7 July 2020, Klonaridis joined Cypriot club APOEL on a free transfer.

Atromitos
On 17 July 2021, Klonaridis returned to Greece and signed a two-year contract with Atromitos.

Personal life
Klonaridis was born in Belgium to a Greek father and a Belgian mother of Flemish ethnicity.
He spent the first years of his life in Uganda.

Career statistics

Notes
A.  Includes appearances in the UEFA Champions League & UEFA Europa League.

Honours
AEK Athens
Super League Greece: 2017–18
Greek Cup: 2010–11

Panathinaikos
Greek Cup: 2013–14

References

External links

 
 

1992 births
Living people
Greek footballers
Greek expatriate footballers
Greek expatriate sportspeople in France
Greek expatriate sportspeople in Cyprus
Greek expatriate sportspeople in Belgium
Association football midfielders
Super League Greece players
Challenger Pro League players
Ligue 1 players
Ligue 2 players
Cypriot First Division players
Royal Excel Mouscron players
AEK Athens F.C. players
Panathinaikos F.C. players
RC Lens players
APOEL FC players
Atromitos F.C. players
Belgium youth international footballers
Belgian expatriate footballers
Belgian expatriate sportspeople in Greece
Belgian expatriate sportspeople in France
Belgian expatriate sportspeople in Cyprus
Greek people of Belgian descent
Greek people of Flemish descent
Expatriate footballers in France
Expatriate footballers in Cyprus
Naturalized citizens of Greece
People from Seraing
Footballers from Liège Province